The Song of First Love is a 1958 Soviet romantic musical film co-directed by Yuri Yerznkyan and Laert Vagharshyan. The film is about a talented singer, spoiled by his success, who almost loses his beloved wife.

The film premiered in Yerevan on 4 April 1958 and in Moscow on 4 August 1958.

The film was Khoren Abrahamyan's first significant role acting in a film. The film was Vagharsh Vagharshian's last film in which he acted.

Plot 
A young singer, Arsen Varunts (Khoren Abrahamyan), who knew fame early,  cannot cope with its burden. His family breaks up, and so too does his voice. An architect in love with Arsen's wife helps Arsen regain his former glory, faith in his talent and win back his wife's love.

Cast 

 Khoren Abrahamyan – Arsen
 Hrachia Nersisyan – Varunts
 Elanora Sudakova – Ruzanna
 Semyon Sokolovsky – Varuzhan
 Vagharsh Vagharshian – Melik-Nubaryan
 Olga Gulazyan – Vartush
 A. Sogomonyan – Onik
 Nikolay Ter-Semyonov – Mamikonyan
 Verdalis Mirijanyan –  Parandzem
 Tamara Kimanyan-Lanko – Ophelia
 A. Selimkhanov – Dodik
 Ivan Grigorievich Grigurov – Excavator operator
 T Bahchinyan – Ruzanna and Arsen's son
 Anna Garagash – Girlfriend
 Gurgen Shahnazaryan – Black marketeer
 Amasi Martirosyan – Guard
 Murad Kostanyan – Varunts's neighbour
 Tatul Dilakyan

Music 
Arno Babajanyan wrote three songs for the film: "Yerevan's lovely girl", "My Yerevan" and "You are the sun of my life". The songs were recorded in May 1957 in Moscow, with an orchestra conducted by Babajanyan, and sung by Sergey Davidyan. It is considered the first Soviet post-war film in which jazz sounded. The screening of the film led Babjanyan's journey to fame.

Reception 
The Song of First Love became the top box office film in the Soviet Union in 1958, watched by 24.6 million viewers. The positive reception of the film was so great that special showings were organised at the newly constructed Luzhniki Stadium in Moscow.

References

External links 

 The Song of First Love on YouTube
 

Armenian-language films
1958 films
Soviet black-and-white films
Soviet-era Armenian films
Armenfilm films
Armenian black-and-white films
Armenian drama films
Films scored by Arno Babajanian